Shellharbour Airport, formerly Illawarra Regional Airport, also referred as Albion Park Aerodrome or Wollongong Airport,  is an airport located in Albion Park Rail, Shellharbour City, New South Wales, Australia. The Historical Aircraft Restoration Society (HARS) is located at the airport. The airline Link Airways offers daily services from the airport to Melbourne–Essendon and Brisbane.

Overview
The airport is owned and operated by Shellharbour City Council.
It is located at the intersection of the Princes Highway and Illawarra Highway at Albion Park Rail. The airport is an 80-minute drive from Sydney Airport and 60 minutes from Sydney's southern suburbs. A regular rail service is available at Albion Park Rail, 900 metres from the passenger terminal, on the South Coast rail line.

The airport is home to the Historical Aircraft Restoration Society (HARS) and a range of tourism-related operations.

History

World War II 
As early as the 1920s, aviators had used fields in the Albion Park area for pleasure flights and demonstrations. RAAF Albion Park was built in 1942 as a Royal Australian Air Force (RAAF) Operational Base during World War II on land compulsorily acquired by the Australian Government. The base was used to conduct pilot training and was considered an important strategic asset in the defence of the Illawarra, particularly the steelworks at Port Kembla. Decorated fighter ace Clive Caldwell, a local resident, received RAAF training at the airfield. A satellite airfield was constructed north of Cordeaux Dam to support operations at Albion Park.

Post War 
Following the war, Trans Australia Airlines and Australian National Airways linked the airport with Canberra and Melbourne until 1950. From 1952, South Coast Airways operated a milk run between Sydney and Melbourne with intermediate stops in Wollongong (Albion Park), Bairnsdale and Sale. Ownership of the airfield was transferred to the Shellharbour Municipal Council in 1962. Queen Elizabeth II and Prince Philip, Duke of Edinburgh visited the airport during a 1970 tour of Australia. Also during the 1970s, Southbank Aviation introduced commuter services from Albion Park to Newcastle and Canberra. The company would later relocate operations to Sydney, but Shellharbour Airport remained an important facility for pilot training and aircraft maintenance into the 1980s.

In 1990, the first master plan was prepared for the Shellharbour Airport (then named Illawarra Regional Airport), providing a framework for future management and developments when Shellharbour City Council assumed full responsibility for the operation of the airport. Throughout the 1990s, development of facilities continued, including the construction of a new passenger terminal and upgrades to roads and navigation aids at the airport. Impulse Airlines operated to the airport from Melbourne and Newcastle until August 2000. In 2002, the Historical Aircraft Restoration Society began relocating their collection of aircraft to Shellharbour Airport from Bankstown Airport in Sydney. Their hangar was completed in 2005, along with several other major upgrades, including the strengthening and reconstruction of runway 16/34 with better lighting, enhanced security, and the opening of Shellharbour City's Light Aeronautics Industry Cluster. Coinciding with this upgrade was the commencement of Qantaslink services to Melbourne, although these were discontinued in 2008. In 2019, it was renamed from Illawarra Regional Airport to its present name.

Airport facilities

There is no control tower located at the airport and pilots must co-ordinate arrivals and departures using a Common Traffic Advisory Frequency, aided by an Aerodrome Frequency Response Unit (AFRU), which notifies pilots that their transmissions have been received on the frequency and activates lighting systems as appropriate. The nearest radio navigation aid for pilots is the Wollongong Non-Directional Beacon installation located within the airport boundary. Fuel is available for piston, turbine and jet powered aircraft and an automated weather service also operates at the airport.

Despite the length of the runway being sufficient for operating large passenger jets such as the Boeing 737, the pavements are currently only suitable for aircraft with a maximum takeoff weight not exceeding . This, as well as environmental and noise issues, limits the potential of Shellharbour Airport as a major gateway for commercial airline operations despite its proximity to Sydney. Despite this, Qantas donated City of Canberra, a Boeing 747-400 on 8 March 2015, where it made its final landing safely on the runway. Pilots trained on simulations for the landing and reduced the aircraft's weight including reducing the tyre pressure to 120 pounds per square inch from the typical 208, and carrying 25,400 litres of fuel, versus the maximum of 217,000 litres.

Airlines and destinations

Passenger

The airline Link Airways offers daily services from the airport to Melbourne (9 weekly returns) and Brisbane (4 weekly returns). Link Airways service these routes using 34 seat Saab 340B+ turboprop aircraft.

Previously, commencing on 30 October 2017, JETGO Australia became the first airline to operate regular passenger services from Wollongong airport since the termination of Qantaslink flights in 2008. This was also the first time that jet aircraft have been operated for scheduled passenger services. Jetgo provided daily flights to Melbourne and Brisbane using Embraer ERJ regional jets of 36 to 50 seats capacity, until the airline went out of business on 1 June 2018.

Historical Aircraft Restoration Society (HARS)

The Historical Aircraft Restoration Society (HARS) is based at Wollongong Airport. HARS was formed in 1979 by a group of aviation enthusiasts interested in the preservation of Australian Aviation History. Its mission is "To recover and where possible restore to flying condition, aircraft or types of aircraft that have played a significant part in Australian Aviation History both in the Civil and Military arenas".
Actor John Travolta donated his ex-Qantas Boeing 707 to the group in 2017. The plane will be flown to the airport after it completed repairs to ensure safe ferry condition. HARS has restored, or acquired:

Boeing 747-438 (VH-OJA)
Boeing 707-138B (N707JT)
Lockheed L-1049 Super Constellation
Consolidated PBY Catalina
Dassault Mirage IIIO (A3-42)
Lockheed P-2 Neptune (273 & 566)
Douglas C47 Dakota (A65-94 & A65-95)
Convair 340-67 Airliner
De Havilland Vampire (A79-637 & A79-665)
Bristol Beaufighter
Bell AH-1 Cobra
de Havilland DHA-3 Drover
Cessna 310 (VH-REK)
De Havilland Tiger Moth
CAC Winjeel
Cessna 180
Cessna 172
De Havilland Canada DHC-4 Caribou (A4-210 and A4-234)
Messerschmitt Bf 108 (NORD 1002)
Let L-200 Morava
Auster Autocar
English Electric Canberra
General Dynamics F-111C
Hawker Hunter FGA
Convair 440
Grumman S-2G Tracker (N12-152812)
Lockheed AP-3C Orion (A9-753)
Mikoyan-Gurevich MiG-21

Accidents and incidents
On 18 December 1961, a Bristol 170 registration VH-AAH operated by Pacific Aviation crashed into trees near the airport during a training flight at Albion Park. The crew were unable to recover after power was lost during a simulated engine failure. All four on board survived the accident.
On 2 April 1989, a Piper PA-60 Sequoia aircraft, registration VH-NOE crashed into the sea off Bass Point, to the east of Illawarra Regional Airport. The charter flight from Sydney was intended to pick up passengers at Wollongong and continue onwards to Nowra and Canberra. By the time of the accident, the passengers had already contacted the Sydney-based operator to cancel the charter, but the aircraft had departed before this could be communicated to the pilot. It is believed the aircraft struck the ocean in poor weather while attempting an instrument approach to the airport. Some debris was later located, but the main wreckage and the remains of the pilot, the only person on board, were never recovered.

See also
List of airports in New South Wales

References

External links

Shellharbour Airport website

Airports in New South Wales
Albion Park Rail, New South Wales
Transport in Wollongong
Airports established in 1942
1942 establishments in Australia